The 2020 NCHC Tournament was the seventh tournament in league history. It was scheduled to be played between March 13 and 21, 2020. Quarterfinal games were to be played at home team campus sites, while the final four games were to be played at the Xcel Energy Center in Saint Paul, Minnesota. On March 12, 2020, NCHC announced that the remainder of the tournament was cancelled due to the coronavirus pandemic, before any games were played.

Format
The first round of the postseason tournament featured a best-of-three games format. All eight conference teams participate in the tournament. Teams are seeded No. 1 through No. 8 according to their final conference standing, with a tiebreaker system used to seed teams with an identical number of points accumulated. The top four seeded teams each earn home ice and host one of the lower seeded teams.

The winners of the first round series advanced to the Xcel Energy Center for the NCHC Frozen Faceoff. The Frozen Faceoff uses a single-elimination format. Teams are re-seeded No. 1 through No. 4 according to the final regular season conference standings.

Standings

Bracket
Teams are reseeded for the Semifinals

* denotes overtime periods

References

NCHC Tournament
National Collegiate Hockey Conference Tournament
NCHC Tournament
College sports in Minnesota
Ice hockey competitions in Saint Paul, Minnesota
NCHC Tournament
NCHC Tournament